Bezitramide is an opioid analgesic. Bezitramide itself is a prodrug which is readily hydrolyzed in the gastrointestinal tract to its active metabolite, despropionyl-bezitramide. Bezitramide was discovered at Janssen Pharmaceutica in 1961. It is most commonly marketed under the trade name Burgodin.

The drug was pulled from the shelves in the Netherlands in 2004 after fatal overdose cases, including one where a five-year-old child took one tablet from his mother's purse, ate it, and promptly died.

Bezitramide is regulated much the same as morphine in all known jurisdictions and is a Schedule II substance under the United States' Controlled Substances Act of 1970, with an ACSCN of 9800 and zero annual manufacturing quota.  However, as of May 2021, it has never been marketed in the United States.

Synthesis

The Sn2 alkylation between 4-bromo-2,2-diphenylbutyronitrile [39186-58-8] (1) and 4-(2-oxo-1-benzimidazolinyl)-piperidine [20662-53-7] (2) with affords depropionylbezitramide [83898-28-6] (3).

See also
 Benperidol
 Brorphine
 J-113,397

References 

Synthetic opioids
Prodrugs
Benzimidazoles
Piperidines
Nitriles
Ureas
Propionamides
Mu-opioid receptor agonists
Janssen Pharmaceutica
Belgian inventions